RCI (formerly Group RCI and, before that, Resort Condominiums International) is a timeshare exchange company with over 4,300 affiliated resorts in 100 countries. 

Founded in Indiana in 1974 by Jon and Christel DeHaan, RCI is one of the two main timeshare exchange businesses, along with Interval International (II).

RCI is part of Wyndham Destination Network and the Wyndham Worldwide family of brands.

Corporate structure
RCI's president is Olivier Chavy. RCI's corporate headquarters is in Parsippany, New Jersey. ln India, RCI's corporate office is in Bangalore, India. Its North American membership office is in Carmel, Indiana, and its European membership office is in Kettering, England, with several satellite servicing offices around the world. Its Asia Pacific membership office is in Singapore.

In July 2007, RCI was merged with Holiday Cottages Group, another of Wyndham Worldwide's subsidiaries. The two would still retain their individual names but operated under the parent name Group RCI until 2010, when the two companies changed the name to Wyndham Exchange and Rentals. In 2018 RCI became part of the split off of Wyndham Worldwide into Wyndham Destinations.

Business model
RCI is a timeshare exchange company. It does not develop or sell timeshares (this falls within the province of RCI's sister subsidiary Wyndham Vacation Clubs).  A customer who buys a timeshare with an RCI-affiliated developer (whether Wyndham or another entity) has the option to become a member of RCI. Such membership entitles the individual to exchange their timeshare with other members; RCI facilitates and fulfills the exchange.  Alternatively, a timeshare owner with an RCI-affiliated developer under a points-based system can book reservations through RCI with another RCI affiliate.

Litigation
A class action lawsuit against RCI was pursued by Green Welling LLP on behalf of RCI Weeks Program members in New Jersey of 2006. The Plaintiff alleged that RCI actually rents out the most desirable and highly demanded vacation weeks from the spacebank, thus depleting the most desirable options available to Weeks Program members who seek exchanges. The lawsuit was settled in favor of the plaintiff. Benefits for RCI members would have begun on January 11, 2010 but one or more appeals of the entry of the final judgment were filed. Thus the Effective Date began July 28, 2010 when all appeals were resolved.

In 2012, RCI, whilst not admitting any wrong-doing, settled the class action concerning its time-share renting tactics in favour of claimants in the US and agreed to compensate those who had suffered. It might be noted that each person was only paid 12.00 for the lawsuit.

Philanthropy
RCI co-founder Christel DeHaan has opened eight schools — known as Christel House International — in Bangalore, India; Naya Raipur, India; Mexico City, Mexico; Cape Town, South Africa; Indianapolis, Indiana, USA. The schools are designed to provide an education to poor children around the world. Christel House announced in July, 2017 that a ninth school will open in Jamaica, August 2019.

Awards
 In 2013, 2012, 2011, 2010, and 2009, RCI was named one of the Best Places to Work in Indiana by the Indiana Chamber of Commerce.
 In 2009, RCI (Grupo RCI Mexico) was named to the 2009 List of Best Companies to Work for in Latin America.
 In 2009, RCI (Grupo RCI Mexico) was named to the 2009 Best Places to Work for in Mexico.

References

External links
 RCI Members website
 RCI Affiliates website

Hospitality companies established in 1974
Companies based in Morris County, New Jersey
Companies based in Indianapolis
Wyndham Destinations
Timeshare chains
1974 establishments in Indiana